Arturo Silot Torres (born 13 April 2001) is a Cuban freestyle wrestler who claimed the silver medal at the 2022 Pan American Championships and the gold medal from the 2021 Junior Pan American Games.

External links

References 

Living people
2001 births
Cuban male sport wrestlers
People from Santiago de Cuba
21st-century Cuban people